= Elohi Gadugi Journal =

- Editor: Duane Poncy, Patricia J. McLean, Ger Killeen
- Categories: Literature
- Frequency: Annual with Quarterly online issues
- First issue: 2012
- Company: Elohi Gadugi
- Country: United States
- Based in: Portland, Oregon
- Language: English
- Website: Elohi Gadugi

Elohi Gadugi Journal is an American magazine that publishes fiction, poetry, reviews, literary nonfiction, art, and multimedia with a social/environmental edge. It is published online in loosely themed quarterly issues. A print edition is to be published annually by Elohi Gadugi, an Oregon nonprofit in Portland, Oregon.

Elohi Gadugi Journal is particularly interested in Native American themes and marginal voices from throughout the world. Editor Duane Poncy is an enrolled citizen of the Cherokee Nation.
